Jay Leno's Garage is an American web and television series about motor vehicles, primarily cars and motorbikes starring Jay Leno, the former host of The Tonight Show. Originally a web series for NBC.com, a special aired on CNBC in August 2014 and the show became a weekly prime-time series on the channel in 2015.

The show's second season premiered on June 15, 2016, followed by season three which debuted on June 28, 2017 and had total of 16 episodes. The fourth season began airing on April 19, 2018.

Leno does car and motorcycle reviews on classic cars, super cars like the McLaren P1, restored cars, vintage and sports cars. Jay Leno's Big Dog Garage is located in Burbank, California, near Hollywood Burbank Airport. In 2016 the show won a Primetime Emmy Award for "Outstanding Special Class – Short-Format Nonfiction Program".

On April 16, 2019, it was announced that the fifth season would premiere on August 28, 2019. Starting on April 15, 2020, CNBC started airing new compilation episodes with new commentary by Leno as well as new segments. The second half of season 5 debuted on May 20, 2020.

The series featured the final television appearance of Norm Macdonald before his death in September 2021.

The series was canceled in January 2023 after seven seasons.

Episodes

Season 1 (2015)

Season 2 (2016)

Season 3 (2017–18)

Season 4 (2018)

Season 5 (2019–20)

Compilation (2020)

Season 6 (2021)

Season 7 (2022)

Broadcast
Internationally, the series premiered in Australia on Discovery Turbo on February 1, 2016 and in the UK on Dave on August 28, 2016.

In Mexico, the first three seasons are available for streaming on Amazon Prime Video.

References

External links
 Jay Leno's Garage TV show official website
 Jay Leno's Garage official website
 
 
 Top 10 Celebrity Car Collectors

2015 American television series debuts
2022 American television series endings
2010s American reality television series
2020s American reality television series
CNBC original programming
Automotive television series
English-language television shows
Garage